Dougenie Tabita Kerbie Joseph (born 13 September 2003), better known as Tabita Joseph, is a Haitian footballer who plays as a defender for AS Tigresses and the Haiti women's national team.

International career
Joseph made a senior appearance for Haiti on 3 October 2019.

References

External links 
 

2003 births
Living people
People from Ouest (department)
Haitian women's footballers
Women's association football defenders
Haiti women's international footballers